Scariff is a Gaelic Athletic Association club in Scariff, Clare, Ireland.

History
There is very little recorded of the first few years of Scariff Hurling Club, but it has almost certainly always been a senior club.
In 1907, Scariff played in its first Clare Senior Hurling Championship county final, beating O'Callaghan Mills.
It won further senior championships in 1917, 1946, 1952 and 1953 and lost the final in 1918, 1919, 1942, 1943, 1960, 1991 and 1995.

Major honours
 Clare Senior Hurling Championship (5): 1907, 1917, 1946, 1952, 1953
 Clare Intermediate Hurling Championship (3): 1938, 1982, 2020
 Clare Junior A Hurling Championship (2): 1936, 1992
 Clare Junior A Football Championship (2): 1952, 1960
 Clare Under-21 A Hurling Championship (2): 1987, 2022 (with Ogonelloe)

Notable managers
 Mike McNamara
 John Minogue
 Donal Moloney

Notable players
Players to play Senior Championship Hurling with Clare 
 John Minogue
 Donal Moloney
 Barry Murphy

See also
 Scarriff
 Clare GAA

References

External links
 Official Scariff Hurling Club website
 Clare GAA Clubs

Gaelic games clubs in County Clare
Hurling clubs in County Clare